Abdallah Seif Bamporiki (died 22 February 2021) was a Rwandan politician. He was a member of the Rwanda National Congress (RNC). On 22 February 2021, Bamporiki was killed in South Africa by two gunmen after being pulled from his vehicle.

References

2021 deaths
Assassinated Rwandan politicians
Deaths by firearm in South Africa
Male murder victims
People murdered in South Africa
Rwandan exiles
Rwandan expatriates in South Africa
Rwandan people murdered abroad
Year of birth missing
Place of birth missing
Place of death missing
Rwanda National Congress politicians